General elections were held in the Cook Islands on 27 September 2006 in order to elect 24 MPs to the Cook Islands Parliament. The Democratic Party remained in power, winning 15 of 24 seats. A total of 8,497 voters turned out to vote.

The election was called two years early after the ruling Democratic party lost its majority in Parliament. In July 2006, Environment Minister Teina Bishop resigned from Cabinet and joined the opposition Cook Islands Party.  Shortly afterwards, the Cook Islands Party won a by-election in Matevera, eliminating the government's majority. The government pre-empted a formal vote of no-confidence by dissolving Parliament and calling an election.

Cook Islands Party leader Sir Geoffrey Henry announced his retirement during the campaign, resulting in his replacement as leader of the opposition by Tom Marsters.  Cook Islands Party MP Wilkie Rasmussen switched his allegiance to the Democratic Party during the campaign, and the CIP was unable to nominate a replacement candidate.  As a result, the seat of Penrhyn was unopposed.

Initial results showed the Democratic Party winning 15 seats, and the Cook Islands Party 8, with one seat being held by an independent and one seat tied.  A number of electoral petitions were filed, resulting in by-elections being held in the seats of Akaoa and Titikaveka.

Results
The electorate of Akaoa was tied, resulting in a by-election.

By electorate

References

 Cook Islands government returned in snap election (SMH)
 Democrats likely winner in Cook Islands poll (Radio NZ)
 Final results of the Cook Islands election 2006

Elections in the Cook Islands
Cook
2006 in the Cook Islands
Cook
Election and referendum articles with incomplete results